Han Derang (941–1011), known for his Khitan name,  Yelü  Longyun, Xingning, or Yaoge was a Chinese politician. He served as the Prime Minister of Liao Dynasty during the reign of Empress Xiao Chuo. He was a native of Hebei Yutian (祖籍河北玉田) and born into the Shihou Family.

Early life
Han Derang was born in 941 as the fourth son of Han Kuangsi, King of Qin (韓匡嗣 秦王) and Lady Xiao (蕭氏). However, his father died in Southwest Nanjing after he went there to meet an envoy.

Political career

Reign of Emperor Jingzong
Han Derang served as a military officer in 979 (10th-year reign of Emperor Jingzong of Liao). He was gradually promoted He stayed in Nanjing and became the most influential and powerful minister not long after his promotion.

In 979, the first year of Qianheng (乾亨), Han fought against the Northern Song Dynasty's invasion at Youdu, Nanjing and was awarded the Liaoxing Army (辽兴军) not long after his campaign against it. After this, he entered North Court as the Secret Envoy from the South Court and become the most powerful person among the Han people. At this time, Han was already 38.

Reign of Emperor Shengzong 
When Emperor Jingzong's oldest son, Yelü Longxu (耶律隆绪) ascended the throne as Emperor Shengzong in 982, Empress Xiao, Jingzong's widow become his regent because Shengzong was only 11 years old. She ordered Han Derang to take charge of the Imperial guards. In 985, Han became a politician and Prime Minister of Liao. Han took an important role in decision-making and in stabilizing the political situation in Shengzong's early years. 

Han led his army to defeat Cao Bin (曹彬) and Mi Xin (米信)'s troops in their Expedition to Northern Song Dynasty. Han became Duke of Chuguo (楚国公) and then King of Chu (楚王). He was later appointed as both Prime Minister of Northern Song (北府宰相) and the Secret Envoy of the Privy Council (兼领枢密使). He was Privy Councilor of Northern Song (兼北院枢密使) too. The Emperor entrusted him and made him King of Qi (齐王). 

After the alliance of Chanyuan, Han become Grand King of Jin (晋国王) and was given Liao's imperial name as Yelü Longyun (耶律隆运). However, in 1011, he followed Shengzong to Goryeo where he passed away and was given the posthumous name of Wénzhōng (文忠). His temple was built in Qianling Mausoleum.

Legacy

Han never married, and he then childless. Knowing this, Shengzong gave Han his brothers, Yelü Longyou (耶律隆祐)'s two sons, Yelü Zongye (耶律宗業) and Yelü Zongfan (耶律宗范) as Han's heirs. However, neither of them had successors. Therefore, during Emperor Daozong's reign and they took Yelü Zongxi, King of Wei (耶律宗熙 魏王)'s son as their heir.

In popular culture
Portrayed by Lee Jin-woo in the 2009 KBS2 TV series Empress Cheonchu.
Portrayed by Shawn Dou in the 2020 Chinese TV Series The Legend of Xiao Chuo.

See also
History of Liao (vol.82)
Emperor Jingzong of Liao
Emperor Shengzong of Liao
Han Kuangsi
Xiao Yanyan
Xiao Hunian
Lady Xiao
Xiao Siwen
The Legend of Xiao Chuo
Gao Xun
Yelü Xiuge
Yelü Xiezhen

References

941 births
1011 deaths
Liao dynasty people
10th-century Chinese people
Liao dynasty politicians
Han Chinese people
Chinese military leaders